Steven Lee Wapnick (born September 25, 1965) is a former Major League Baseball pitcher.  He played for the Detroit Tigers and the Chicago White Sox.  He held batters to a .222 batting average, holding righties to a .115 batting average.

Early life
Wapnick was born in Panorama City, California, and is Jewish. He attended Monroe High School in Sepulveda, California.  He then attended Moorpark College and Fresno State University, where he pitched for the Bulldogs, and he threw and batted right-handed.

Amateur draft
Each time, his place in the draft slipped. The San Diego Padres drafted him in the second round of the 1985 Major League Baseball Draft. When he did not sign with them, the Oakland Athletics drafted him in fifth round of the June Secondary Phase, but again he didn't sign. Finally, he was drafted in 1987 by the Toronto Blue Jays, but not until round 30. He finally signed with them, and reported to the minor league St. Catharines Blue Jays shortly thereafter.

Professional career

Detroit Tigers
On December 4, 1989, Wapnick was drafted from the Blue Jays by the Detroit Tigers in the Rule 5 Draft. His first Major League game was April 14, 1990 at the age of 24. He appeared in just four games for the Tigers, posting an ERA of 6.43, and was returned to the Blue Jays on May 1.

Wapnick was one of two Jewish baseball players to make his major league debut in 1990.  The other was Scott Radinsky. He wore number 43 for the Tigers.

Chicago White Sox
After spending most of the 1991 season with the Blue Jays top farm club, the Syracuse Chiefs, with whom he led the International League in saves with 20, on September 4 Wapnick was sent to the Chicago White Sox as the player to be named later in a deal that involved Shawn Jeter going to the Sox for outfielder Cory Snyder. Now wearing uniform number 51, Wapnick appeared in six more games for Chicago down the stretch, winning none and losing one with an ERA of 1.80. He never appeared in the majors again.

Back to the minors
He injured his arm in 1992 during spring training, which was the beginning of the end for his career. He pitched two more seasons in the minors, one in the White Sox organization and one for the Seattle Mariners top farm team, the Calgary Cannons.

Overall, in 12 career innings of work over 10 games, during 2 seasons, Wapnick walked 14 and struck out 7.

Personal life
After his playing career, Wapnick coached at Clovis High School and Sierra High School, and also coached a Junior USA baseball team. He resides in Northern Colorado Where he coached at Resurrection Christian School for a number of years.

See also
List of select Jewish baseball players

References

External links

Retrosheet info page
Venezuelan Professional Baseball League statistics

1965 births
American expatriate baseball players in Canada
Baseball players from California
Calgary Cannons players
Caribes de Oriente players
American expatriate baseball players in Venezuela
Chicago White Sox players
Detroit Tigers players
Dunedin Blue Jays players
Fresno State Bulldogs baseball players
Jewish American baseball players
Jewish Major League Baseball players
Knoxville Blue Jays players
Living people
Major League Baseball pitchers
Moorpark Raiders baseball players
Myrtle Beach Blue Jays players
St. Catharines Blue Jays players
Syracuse Chiefs players
Vancouver Canadians players
People from Panorama City, Los Angeles
21st-century American Jews
Anchorage Glacier Pilots players